Joaquín Nicolás Pereyra (born 1 December 1998) is an Argentine footballer who plays as a winger for Atlético Tucumán, on loan from Rosario Central.

Club career

Roasrio Central
Pereyra is a youth exponent from Rosario Central. He made his league debut on 28 February 2016 against CA Colón in a 1--0 home win. He replaced Walter Montoya after 80 minutes.

Famalicão
On 10 September 2020, the Portuguese top-tier club Famalicão announced that Pereyra had joined them on loan until the end of season.

References

1998 births
Living people
Association football midfielders
Argentine footballers
Argentina under-20 international footballers
Rosario Central footballers
F.C. Famalicão players
Atlético Tucumán footballers
Argentine Primera División players
Primeira Liga players
Argentine expatriate footballers
Argentine expatriate sportspeople in Portugal
Expatriate footballers in Portugal
People from Paraná, Entre Ríos
Sportspeople from Entre Ríos Province